East Side, West Side is a 1949 American melodrama crime film, starring Barbara Stanwyck, James Mason, Van Heflin, and Ava Gardner. Based on the 1947 novel of the same title, written by Marcia Davenport, screenplay by Isobel Lennart, produced by Voldemar Vetluguin, directed by Mervyn LeRoy, and distributed by Metro-Goldwyn-Mayer.

Opening narration by Barbara Stanwyck
"Yes, this is my town. It's not new to you — you've read books about it... you've seen it in movies. People are always talking about New York — it's the most exciting city in the world they say... the most glamorous, the most frightening and, above all, the fastest. You hear a great deal about the tempo of this city — its speed, its pace, its driving heartbeat. Perhaps it's true... for visitors. But I was born here... I live here... and the only pace I know is the pace of my own life... the only beat I hear is the beat of my own heart and, like for millions of others, New York is home. The days follow each other quietly, as they do in most places. Only really does any one time stand out so that we remember it and say, 'that's when everything changed — after that nothing was the same'. There was a time like that in my life... three days. I remember a summer evening in Gramercy Park..."

Plot
In 1946, New York socialite Jessie Bourne suspects her husband Brandon of infidelity. Years before, his affair with party girl Isabel Lorrison had nearly torpedoed the Bournes' marriage. Now, Isabel's back, escorted around town by tough-guy Alec Dawning, a man with a short temper. When he sees Isabel with Brandon, he decks the latter outside a ritzy nightclub. Unfortunately, the punch is recorded by a tabloid photographer, and Brandon is front-page news.

In the meantime, Jessie becomes acquainted with Mark Dwyer, a former city cop and, more recently, a U.S. Army intelligence officer just returned from Italy. The two discover a mutual attraction, yet their relationship remains platonic. One afternoon, while Brandon is at work in his law office, Jessie asks Mark to drive her to a Washington Square apartment. He waits outside, unaware that the apartment is Isabel's and that Jessie has come to confront her over seeing Brandon. The meeting degenerates into a bitter quarrel, and a frustrated Jessie walks out.

Later that afternoon, Brandon goes to Isabel's apartment, where he finds her dead body. He notifies the police and then leaves a message with wife Jessie to call him back—at Isabel's apartment. She does, and Brandon informs her of Isabel's fate. After the police arrive and investigate, they cast suspicion on Brandon. Then Jessie enters, accompanied by Dwyer, who turns out to be an old acquaintance of Lt. Jacobi, the detective in charge of the case. Convinced that neither Jessie nor her husband killed Isabel, Dwyer sets out to discover who did. With only the clue of a broken fingernail found at the crime scene, former policeman Dwyer nabs the culprit, clearing both Mr. and Mrs. Bourne. At the story's conclusion, with her marriage destroyed and Dwyer called back to duty by the Army, Jessie is left to ponder her future.

Cast

Barbara Stanwyck as Jessie Bourne
James Mason as Brandon Bourne
Van Heflin as Mark Dwyer
Ava Gardner as Isabel Lorrison
Cyd Charisse as Rosa Senta
Nancy Davis as Helen Lee
Gale Sondergaard as Nora Kernan
William Conrad as Lt. Jacobi
Raymond Greenleaf as Horace Elcott Howland
Douglas Kennedy as Alec Dawning
Beverly Michaels as Felice Backett
William Frawley as Bill the Bartender
Lisa Golm as Josephine
Tom Powers as Owen Lee

Reception
According to MGM records, the film earned $1,518,000 in the U.S. and Canada and $1,022,000 in other markets, resulting in a profit to the studio of $31,000.

Critical response and evaluation in film guides
Upon the movie's release in the U.K., The Spectator'''s longtime film critic  Virginia Graham called it a "glossy" tale of "a man's irremediable dislike for monogamy and woman's patience, up to a point, with this innate weakness of his." Graham praised Mason for his range and Gardner for lending her "somewhat conventional part" a "splendid radiance to the screen by virtue of her overpowering good looks." Leading lady Stanwyck, the critic added, "gives a lively, sympathetic and thoroughly positive performance. In one scene, when she tries to disguise her marital fears from a woman friend, we are given as nice a piece of acting as you would find anywhere." 

Both Steven H. Scheuer's Movies on TV (1972–73 edition) and Leonard Maltin's Classic Movie Guide (third edition, 2015) gave East Side, West Side 2½ stars (out of 4), with Scheuer characterizing it as a "[S]lickly mounted soap opera set in the chic world of the wealthy social set of New York" and adding that "Miss Stanwyck overacts" and "Ava slinks in and out of the proceedings as a femme fatale". Maltin described the film as a "[S]tatic MGM version of Marcia Davenport's superficial novel" and summarized that "Stanwyck and Mason have pivotal roles as chic N.Y.C. society couple with abundant marital woes, stirred up by alluring Gardner and understanding Heflin."

Among British references, David Shipman in his 1984 The Good Film and Video Guide'' gave it 1 ["Recommended with reservations"] (out of 4) stars, noting that it is "[A] terribly well-bred soap-opera about a New York couple who need a spot of sorting out." He described Mason's character as "a notorious philanderer currently stuck on Ava Gardner", Stanwyck as "long-suffering and neglected" and the supporting cast as "[I]nvolved in their not too engrossing affairs".

See also

 1949 in film
 List of American films of 1949
 List of crime films of the 1940s

References

External links

1949 crime drama films
1949 films
Adultery in films
American crime drama films
American black-and-white films
Films scored by Miklós Rózsa
Films based on American novels
Films directed by Mervyn LeRoy
Films set in Manhattan
Films set in New York City
Melodrama films
Metro-Goldwyn-Mayer films
1940s English-language films
1940s American films